The document On the Pastoral Care of Homosexual Persons, also known by its opening words Homosexualitatis problema, was a pastoral letter authored by the Congregation for the Doctrine of the Faith (CDF) of the Roman Catholic Church addressed to the Bishops of the Catholic Church that was delivered in Rome on 1 October 1986 by Cardinal Joseph Ratzinger (later Pope Benedict XVI) and Archbishop Alberto Bovone. The letter gave instructions on how the clergy should deal with and respond to lesbian, gay, and bisexual people. Pope John Paul II approved the letter and ordered its publication. It was designed to correct misunderstandings and misinterpretations of a 1975 CDF letter, Declaration on Certain Questions Concerning Sexual Ethics (Persona Humana).

Ratzinger clarified that the Church's teaching on the sinfulness of homosexual acts is much more nuanced than is commonly believed by the media and by some Catholics:It has been argued that the homosexual orientation in certain cases is not the result of deliberate choice; and so the homosexual person would then have no choice but to behave in a homosexual fashion. Lacking freedom, such a person, even if engaged in homosexual activity, would not be culpable. Here, the Church's wise moral tradition is necessary since it warns against generalizations in judging individual cases. In fact, circumstances may exist, or may have existed in the past, which would reduce or remove the culpability of the individual in a given instance; or other circumstances may increase it. What is at all costs to be avoided is the unfounded and demeaning assumption that the sexual behaviour of homosexual persons is always and totally compulsive and therefore inculpable.

In the letter the cardinal stated, "Although the particular inclination of the homosexual person is not a sin, it is a more or less strong tendency ordered toward an intrinsic moral evil; and thus the inclination itself must be seen as an objective disorder. ....It is deplorable that homosexual persons have been and are the object of violent malice in speech or in action. Such treatment deserves condemnation from the Church's pastors wherever it occurs." 

Ratzinger asserted that, while Christians rightly oppose any violence against homosexual persons, it is wrong to then claim that the homosexual orientation is good or neutral: But the proper reaction to crimes committed against homosexual persons should not be to claim that the homosexual condition is not disordered. When such a claim is made and when homosexual activity is consequently condoned, or when civil legislation is introduced to protect behaviour to which no one has any conceivable right, neither the Church nor society at large should be surprised when other distorted notions and practices gain ground, and irrational and violent reactions increase.

In 2006, the United States Conference of Catholic Bishops issued "Guidelines for Pastoral Care" for those in the Ministry to Persons with a Homosexual Inclination.

See also
Catholic teachings on sexual morality
Homosexuality and Roman Catholicism
Virtually Normal

Notes

External links
 Text 

Documents of the Congregation for the Doctrine of the Faith
Works about LGBT and Catholicism
1986 documents
1986 in Christianity
1986 in LGBT history